Alpha Phi International Women's Fraternity (also known as APhi) is an international sorority with 172 active chapters and over 250,000 initiated members.

Founded at Syracuse University in Syracuse, New York on September 18, 1872, it is the fourth Greek-letter organization founded for women, and the first women's fraternity founded in the northeast.

Alpha Phi is a member of the National Panhellenic Conference, the governing council of 26 women's fraternities. Alpha Phi's international headquarters are located in Evanston, Illinois.

History
At the time of the founding there were only 666 women attending Syracuse; ten of them eventually formed Alpha Phi to create an organization "on the principles of the promotion of growth in character; unity of feeling, sisterly affection, and social communion among the members." Alpha Phi considers itself a women's fraternity because its founding date predates the invention of the word "sorority".

Founders
Alpha Phi's founding members were:

Martha Emily Foote Crow – Martha "Mattie" Foote Crow (1854 – January 1, 1924) was an educator and writer. Born in Sackets Harbor, New York, she played an important role in the development of higher education for women in the United States.
 Rena A. Michaels Atchison – She served as a professor at several universities. She then served as Dean of Women's College, Northwestern University from 1886 to 1891.
Clara Bradley Baker Wheeler Burdette
 Jane Sara Higham
 Clara Sittser Williams
 Florence Chidester Lukens
 Ida Arabella Gilbert DeLamanter Houghton
 Kate Elizabeth Hogoboom Gilbert
 Louise Viola Shepard Hancock
 Elizabeth Grace Hubbell Shults

Symbols
Like many other women's fraternities, Alpha Phi recognizes multiple types of symbols, with the Ivy Leaf as their primary symbol.

The fraternity's official colors are bordeaux and silver. The colors were originally blue and gold; however, these colors were similar to those of Delta Upsilon Fraternity so they were changed.

The official flowers are the Lily of the Valley and the Forget-me-not.

Alpha Phi lists its ideals as "Sisterhood, Generosity, Innovation, and Character."

Alpha Phi's public motto is "union hand in hand".

Badge
The Alpha Phi badge is the Greek letter Alpha resting on the Greek letter Phi, engraved with the Greek acronym . It can be customized in silver or gold and may be adorned with only white jewels - pearls or diamonds. Prior to the adoption of the current badge in 1906, "each member [of Alpha Phi] went to the jeweler of her choice to have her pin designed." The Alpha Phi badge is worn by initiated members, as there is a separate badge for new members before their initiation.

Other forms of badges:

 Honor Badge – These pins are worn by international officers, and presidents of college chapters while they are serving their terms as president.
 New member Badge – "In 1898 the Fraternity adopted a special badge to honor her newest members. The badge they selected is in the shape of an ivy leaf, set in silver pewter. An ever-growing vine, the ivy symbolizes the growth of the Alpha Phi sisterhood."
 Fifty-Year Pin – "The first fifty-year pins, silver circles with red stones, were presented at the 42nd Convention in 1958 to several alumnae who had given significant service to the fraternity for 50 years or more. These pins are replicas of the pins presented to the six living founders at the Fraternity's Fiftieth Anniversary Convention in 1922."

Philanthropy 

In 1956, Alpha Phi became one of the first women's fraternities to establish a Foundation. Alpha Phi officially adopted Cardiac Care as its philanthropic priority in 1946, which then became the Foundation's focus, along with awarding academic scholarships, upon its founding in 1956. The Foundation supports Alpha Phi's leadership training and programming, awards need-based and merit-based scholarships, invests in the advancement of women's heart health, and preserves Alpha Phi's rich and expansive heritage.

The Foundation most notable program is its Women's Heart Health Program and Heart to Heart to Grant, a $100,000 grant awarded to medical professionals to better understand heart disease in women—specifically its symptoms, treatment, and prevention. Since its establishment in 1993, the Heart to Heart Grant has invested over $1.4 million in women's heart health initiatives. Collegiate chapters, alumnae chapters and individual members can nominate a local heart project for the Heart to Heart Grant. Self-nominations are also accepted. The recipient is selected by a team of medical professionals and the Foundation Board of Directors.

Starting in the early 2000s, many collegiate chapters of Alpha Phi host a philanthropy event known as Red Dress Gala, which often includes a silent auction, guest speakers, and a full dinner for sisters, alumnae, and family. Traditionally, the collegiate members wear red dresses and pins to represent their support for Women's Heart Health. Individual Alpha Phi chapters are encouraged to develop a relationship with a local cardiac care project in their community as well as to promote awareness of women's heart disease.

In 2021, Alpha Phi Foundation announced their $38 million comprehensive endowment campaign, Leading With Heart, the largest known campaign of its kind in the National Panhellenic Conference space.

Past recipients of the Heart to Heart Grant 

1993 – Program in Women's Cardiovascular Health – University Hospitals of Cleveland – nominated by the Cleveland East Alumnae chapter
1994 – Brigham and Women's Hospital, Cardiovascular Division – nominated by the Zeta Phi Chapter, Massachusetts Institute of Technology
1995 – Beth Israel Deaconess Medical Center, formerly the Deaconess Hospital, Institute for Prevention of Cardiovascular Disease – nominated by the Zeta Phi Chapter, Massachusetts Institute of Technology
1997 – Presbyterian Healthcare Foundation's "Women's Heart Night Out" – nominated by the Albuquerque Alumnae Chapter
1998 – Egleston Children's Hospital's Sibley Heart Center – nominated by the Atlanta Alumnae Chapter and Theta Pi Chapter, Emory University
1999 – California Pacific Medical Center/Transitional Cardiac Care Unit – nominated by the San Francisco Alumnae Chapter
2000 – University of Cincinnati Women's Health Program – nominated by the Cincinnati Alumnae Chapter
2001 – Allen Memorial Hospital – nominated by the Epsilon Theta Chapter, University of Northern Iowa
2002 and 2003 – Mercy Medical Center of Northern Iowa – nominated by Kaitlin Maguire (Gamma Omicron, Drake University)
2004 – Mainline Health Heart Center
2005 – Cleveland Clinic Foundation
2006 – American Heart Association of San Diego, CA
2007 – University of Colorado Hospital (and) American Heart Association of San Diego, CA
2008 – Events of the Heart of New York, NY
2009 – Women's Heart Program at the University of North Carolina at Chapel Hill
2010 – Oregon Health and Science University Foundation (and) Greater Boston Division of the American Heart Association
2011 – St. Luke's Hospital Foundation in Kansas City, MO
2012 – University of Washington Division of Cardiology
2013 – Texas Heart Institute in Houston, TX
2014 – Memorial Hermann Foundation
2015 – Geisinger Health System
2016 – University of Louisville Foundation
2017 – Texas Heart Institute in Houston, TX
2018 – Yale School of Medicine
2019 – UC Davis Health
2020 – University of Iowa
2021 – Duke University School of Nursing
2022 – Perelman School of Medicine at the University of Pennsylvania

Note: Texas Heart Institute has been awarded the grant twice, in 2013 and 2017.

Local chapter or member misconduct
In 2013, Miss America 2015 Kira Kazantsev was terminated from the Theta Mu chapter at Hofstra University for abusive hazing. At the time, Kazantsev was serving the chapter as head of recruitment.

In 2015, the Beta Mu chapter at the University of Alabama took down a recruitment video that was heavily criticized for its lack of diversity and the provocative way in which collegiate women were portrayed.

In October 2016, the Iota Delta chapter at the University of Rhode Island charter was revoked for at least four years. On bid day, the sorority was accused of endangering the health and safety of new members and violating the university's alcohol policy.

In January 2018, Harley Barber, a member of the Beta Mu chapter at the University of Alabama was terminated from the sorority and expelled from the college after posting videos on social media in which she repeatedly used the n-word and other profanities to make degrading comments about African Americans. The incident gained media coverage across the country, University President Stuart R. Bell, the University Panhellenic Association, and Linda Kahangi, executive director of Alpha Phi International Fraternity released statements.

In January 2018, three members of the Iota Iota chapter at the George Washington University were removed from the organization due to what was deemed a racist social media post. The incident prompted criticism from national and international news sources and the university's Student Association received petitions to remove the chapter from campus.

In September 2018, a document by a former recruitment chair of the University of Michigan Alpha Phi chapter surfaced with descriptions of how the chapter's membership selection process was based on selecting for certain physical appearances and assigned numbers to these women based on the judgment of the recruitment chairs and representatives from their international headquarters. The exposé described that Alpha Phi supervisors ordered her to give the PNMs an "External Prescore" based on pictures from their social media profiles. Throughout the recruitment process, active members in the sorority were also ranked on superficial qualities and matched with "stronger" or "weaker" PNMs.

In January 2019, the Alpha Phi chapter at Old Dominion University was accused of racist behavior within the members of the sorority. School officials are investigating the allegations and the chapter cannot currently hold functions of any kind at this time.

Membership

Chapters

Notable alumnae 
Business

Nancy Austin (Beta Delta – UCLA) – Management consultant and author of The Assertive Woman
Susan Bayh (Lambda – UC Berkeley) – Attorney and professional director
Marisol Deluna (Alpha Lambda – Alumna Initiate) – Fashion designer
Kimberly Kelleher (Iota – Wisconsin) – President of Advertising Sales and Partnerships for AMC Networks
Deborah Lippmann (Gamma Pi – Arizona State) – Singer and celebrity manicurist with her own line, the Lippmann Collection
Janet Murguía (Gamma Delta – Kansas) – First female president/CEO of National Council of La Raza
Julee Rosso (Beta Beta – Michigan State) – Founder of The Silver Palate gourmet food shop and Co-author of Silver Palate Cookbook
Alice Waters (Gamma Beta – UC Santa Barbara) – Author, chef, founder of Chez Panisse, the original "California Cuisine" restaurant
Beverly Willis (Beta Upsilon – Oregon State) – Architect, artist, author, and activist
Andrea Wong (Zeta Phi – MIT) – American television executive, former president and chief executive officer of Lifetime Television

Entertainment

Remi Bader (Epsilon Nu – Delaware)  – TikTok Content Creator and Curve Model
Lana Coffey (Zeta Rho – Bentley University) – Miss Connecticut Teen USA 2017
Katelynne Cox (Omicron – Missouri) – Musician, model, congressional aide, news anchor
Rosemarie DeWitt (Theta Mu – Hofstra) – Actress, (Standoff, Mad Men, Rachel Getting Married, United States of Tara)
Mildred Dunnock (Zeta – Goucher) – Academy Award-nominated film and stage actress
Amy Okuda (Beta Pi – USC) – Actress (Atypical)
Jeannette Paulson Hereniko (Tau – Oregon) – American film producer, television writer, film festival director and founder
Olivia Jordan (Eta – Boston) – Miss USA 2015, 2nd runner up in Miss Universe 2015
Gabrielle Ruiz (Delta Delta – Oklahoma City University) – Actress, dancer and singer (Crazy Ex-Girlfriend)
Jeri Ryan (Beta – Northwestern) – Actress, (Boston Public, Star Trek: Voyager, Dark Skies, Shark, Leverage, Body of Proof)
Inga Swenson (Beta – Northwestern) – Tony Award-nominated actress (The Miracle Worker, Benson)
Randi Mayem Singer (Lambda – UC Berkeley) – Writer and producer
Jennifer Tisdale (Epsilon Upsilon – CSU/Northridge) – Actress, (The Hillside Strangler, Dark Ride, Undressed)
Josie Totah (Eta Upsilon – Chapman) – Actress (Other People, Saved By The Bell)
Hannah Wagner (Gamma Xi – Wichita State) – Miss Kansas 2015
Kimberly Williams-Paisley (Beta – Northwestern) – Actress, (Father of the Bride, According to Jim, We Are Marshall)

Education, literature, and medicine

Edris Rice-Wray Carson (Delta – Cornell) – Public health doctor
Martha Foote Crow (Alpha – Syracuse) – Founder, educator, and writer
Molly Dillon (Zeta Omicron – Johns Hopkins) – Civil rights advocate, policymaker, writer and compiler of Yes She Can
Sage Lenier (Lambda – UC Berkeley) – Student environmental professor and activist
Margaret McNamara (Lambda – UC Berkeley) – Founder of Reading Is Fundamental
Barbara Brooks Wallace (Beta Delta – UCLA) – Award-winning children's author
Janice Woods Windle (Omega – Texas) – Author of True Women

News, media, and journalism

Lisa Colagrossi (Beta Iota – West Virginia) – Emmy winning television anchor with WABC-TV in New York
Ann Martin (Sigma – Washington) – Primetime news anchor and co-host of Woman 2 Woman, KCBS-TV, Los Angeles
Nan C. Robertson (Beta – Northwestern) – Pulitzer Prize-winning reporter and feature writer for The New York Times
Kaitlan Collins (Beta Mu – Alabama) – Blogger and White House correspondent for CNN
Taylor Lorenz (Beta Gamma – Colorado) – Columnist for The Washington Post

Politics and government

Elaine Baxter (Beta Alpha – Illinois) – Former Iowa secretary of state and former member of the Iowa House of Representatives
Nancy Brataas (Epsilon – Minnesota) – First woman Minnesota Senate member elected of her own right
Becky Cain (Beta Iota – West Virginia) – Past president of the League of Women Voters
Liz Carpenter (Omega – Texas) – Author, political humorist, former press secretary for Lady Bird Johnson
Georgia Neese Clark Gray (Upsilon – Washburn) – First woman Treasurer of the United States
Joy Flowers Conti (Epsilon Iota – Duquesne) – District judge for the United States District Court for the Western District of Pennsylvania
Mary Prior Dambman (Gamma Theta – Colorado College) – Former Colorado House of Representatives member
Pauline Kubala Gubbels (Omega – Texas) – Former New Mexico Legislature member 
Shirley McLoughlin (Xi, Beta Theta) – First woman to lead a political party in British Columbia
Mary H. Murguia (Gamma Delta – Kansas) – United States federal judge
Amanda Nguyen (Iota Tau – Harvard) – Nobel Peace Prize nominee and CEO and founder of Rise
Dorothy Wright Nelson (Beta Delta – UCLA) – United States federal judge
Polly Rosenbaum (Beta Gamma – Colorado) – Arizona's longest-serving state legislator
Emily Anne Staples (Epsilon – Minnesota) – Former Minnesota Senate member
Frances Willard (Alpha Lambda – Alumna Initiate) – American educator, temperance reformer, and women's suffragist
Lynn Woolsey (Sigma – Washington) – Member of the United States House of Representatives
Jodi White (Xi – Toronto) – Canadian politician

Sports

Kelly Barnhill (Kappa Eta – Florida) – Award-winning American collegiate and professional softball player, three-time USA women's national softball team member
Susie Berning (Delta Delta – Oklahoma City) – American professional golfer
Julie Clark (Gamma Beta – UC Santa Barbara) – American airline pilot and aerobatic performer
Claire Waters Ferguson (Beta Beta – Michigan State) – First woman president of the United States Figure Skating Association
Stacia Hookom (Beta Gamma – Colorado) – First woman on U.S. Snowboarding team, multiple national/world titles/appearances
Edean Anderson Ihlanfeldt (Beta Upsilon – Oregon State) – Golfer, champion of multiple national titles for US and Canada
Jennifer Joines (Iota Gamma – University of the Pacific) – Silver medal-winning American indoor volleyball player in the 2008 Beijing Olympics
Janis Klecker (Epsilon – Minnesota) – American long-distance runner, two-time United States national champion in the marathon
Marion Roper (Beta Delta – UCLA) –  Bronze medal-winning American diver in the 1932 Summer Olympics

Religion

Ruth Stafford Peale (Alpha – Syracuse) – Religious leader, public speaker and author
Catherine Maples Waynick (Epsilon Zeta – Central Michigan) – One of only eight women to be bishops in the U.S. Episcopal Church

See also

List of social fraternities and sororities

References

External links

Alpha Phi Homepage
Alpha Phi Foundation

 
1872 establishments in New York (state)
National Panhellenic Conference
Student societies in the United States
Student organizations established in 1872